Life on a Plate is the second album by the Swedish punk rock band Millencolin, released on 11 October 1995 by Burning Heart Records. It reached No. 4 on the Swedish music charts upon its release and was certified gold in sales in 2002 after selling over 50,000 copies in Sweden. Swedish magazine Slitz also named its cover art, created by band member Erik Ohlsson, as the "Album Cover of the Year" for 1995. Life on a Plate was re-released in the United States the following year by Epitaph Records on 26 March 1996.

Reception

NME listed the album as one of "20 Pop Punk Albums Which Will Make You Nostalgic".

Track listing
All songs written by Nikola Sarcevic except where noted.

Personnel

Millencolin
Nikola Sarcevic - lead vocals, bass
Erik Ohlsson - guitar
Mathias Färm - guitar
Fredrik Larzon - drums

Others
Fredrik Folcke - saxophone
Markus Lowegren - trombone

References

External links

Life on a Plate at YouTube (streamed copy where licensed)

Millencolin albums
1995 albums
Epitaph Records albums
Burning Heart Records albums